Electric Cord is a 1961 pop art painting by Roy Lichtenstein. 

In October 2012, the painting was returned to the widow of Leo Castelli after it had gone missing 42 years prior. Castelli had purchased the painting in the 1960s for $750. In 2012, it was estimated to be worth $4 million.

See also

 1961 in art

References

1961 paintings
Paintings by Roy Lichtenstein